Brachidontes exustus, or the Scorched mussel, is a species of bivalve mollusc in the family Mytilidae. It can be found along the Atlantic coast of North America, ranging from Cape Hatteras to the West Indies and Brazil.

References

Mytilidae
Bivalves described in 1758
Taxa named by Carl Linnaeus
Bivalves of North America